American singer Toni Braxton has released ten studio albums, five extended plays, six compilation albums, two remix albums, thirty-four singles (including three featured singles), two video albums and twenty-two music videos in a career spanning over 30 years. Braxton was born in Severn, Maryland, on October 7, 1967. Her mother, an opera vocalist, encouraged Braxton and her four sisters to sing in church at a young age. In 1990, songwriter Bill Pettaway discovered the sisters and helped them obtain a record deal with Arista Records, as the group titled The Braxtons; the group's debut single, "Good Life", was released the same year. Although the song failed to chart, Braxton's voice caught the attention of producers, L.A. Reid and Babyface, who signed her to their newly formed LaFace Records. In 1991, Braxton recorded songs for the soundtrack to the 1992 film Boomerang. Her solo debut single, "Love Shoulda Brought You Home", reached the top thirty of the US Billboard Hot 100 chart and the top five of the Hot R&B/Hip-Hop Songs chart. Two years later, her self-titled debut album was issued through LaFace. The album topped the US Billboard 200 and R&B/Hip-Hop Albums charts and was certified eight-times platinum by the Recording Industry Association of America (RIAA). It spawned four singles, including "Breathe Again", which peaked within the top ten in the United States, Australia, Canada, Ireland, the Netherlands and the United Kingdom. The album has sold over ten million copies worldwide.

Braxton's second studio album, Secrets, was released in 1996. Featuring songwriting and production by Reid, Babyface, Diane Warren, R. Kelly and David Foster, the album peaked at number two on the Billboard 200 chart and was certified eight-times platinum by the RIAA. It also made the top ten in many other countries including Canada, Germany, the Netherlands, Switzerland and the United Kingdom. The album features four singles, including two double A-sides. The first single, "You're Makin' Me High", became Braxton's first number one single in the United States, where it topped the Hot 100 and R&B charts. "Un-Break My Heart", the album's second single, topped the charts in the United States, Sweden, and Switzerland and peaked within the top five in Canada, Germany, Ireland, the Netherlands and the United Kingdom; it became the second biggest-selling single by a female artist in the United States. Secrets has sold about fifteen million copies worldwide. The following year, Braxton filed a lawsuit against LaFace, which asked for a release from her record contract. However, LaFace countersued, a move which prompted Braxton to file for bankruptcy. She spent the next year in a state of oblivion, but reached an agreement with LaFace the year after. Her third studio album, The Heat, was released in April 2000. The album debuted at number two on the Billboard 200 chart and topped the R&B/Hip-Hop Albums chart. It also reached number one in Canada and charted within the top ten in France, Germany, the Netherlands, Switzerland and the United Kingdom. The lead single, "He Wasn't Man Enough", became another top-five Hot 100 entry in the United States for Braxton and the second single, "Just Be a Man About It", became a top-10 R&B entry. The Heat was certified double platinum by the RIAA and has sold four million copies worldwide. Braxton released her first Christmas album, Snowflakes, the next year. Her fifth studio album More Than a Woman was released in 2002. In the United States, the album charted within the top 20 and also received a gold certification.

In April 2003, Braxton parted ways with LaFace and Arista and signed a record deal with Blackground Records. Libra, the first album release through them, debuted at number four on the Billboard 200 chart and was certified gold by the RIAA. Braxton spent the next three years as the main performer at the Flamingo Hotel & Casino, Las Vegas and later participated on the television series Dancing with the Stars. In October 2008, she signed a record deal with Atlantic Records. Pulse, her seventh studio album,  was released in May 2010. The album became another R&B chart-topper for Braxton and cracked the top ten of the Billboard 200 chart. The lead single from the album, "Yesterday", peaked at number twelve on the R&B/Hip-Hop Songs chart. In a career now spanning over two decades, Braxton has accumulated sales of 70 million records worldwide.

Albums

Studio albums

Compilation albums

Box sets

Extended plays

Singles

1990s

2000s

2010s

2020s

As featured artist

Guest appearances

Videography

Video albums

Music videos

Guest appearances

See also
 List of songs recorded by Toni Braxton

Notes

References

External links
 
 Toni Braxton videography at MTV.com
 
 
 

Discography
Discographies of American artists
Rhythm and blues discographies